Destutia flumenata is a species of moth in the family Geometridae first described by Pearsall in 1906. It is found in North America.

The MONA or Hodges number for Destutia flumenata is 6880.

References

Further reading

 

Ourapterygini
Articles created by Qbugbot
Moths described in 1906